Jay Miller (born c. 1954) was an American football player.  He grew up in San Jose, California, and played college football for the BYU Cougars football team from 1972 to 1976. In 11 games during the 1973 season, he caught 100 passes for 1,181 yards and 8 touchdowns. He led the NCAA Division I-A colleges that year both in receptions and receiving yards. In a November 1973 game against New Mexico, he set an NCAA single game record with 22 receptions.

See also
 List of NCAA major college football yearly receiving leaders

References

American football wide receivers
BYU Cougars football players
Living people
1954 births